Chouto is a former civil parish in the municipality of Chamusca, Portugal. In 2013, the parish merged into the new parish Parreira e Chouto. It covers an area of 205.3 km² and had a population of 715 as of 2001.

References

Former parishes of Chamusca